Salem Township is one of the eighteen townships of Monroe County, Ohio, United States. As of the 2010 census, the population was 1,001, including 384 people in the village of Clarington.

Geography
Located in the eastern part of the county along the Ohio River, it borders the following townships:
Switzerland Township - north
Ohio Township - south
Green Township - southwest
Adams Township - west
Marshall County, West Virginia lies across the Ohio River to the east.

The village of Clarington is located in northeastern Salem Township along the Ohio River.

Name and history
It is one of fourteen Salem Townships statewide.

Government
The township is governed by a three-member board of trustees, who are elected in November of odd-numbered years to a four-year term beginning on the following January 1. Two are elected in the year after the presidential election and one is elected in the year before it. There is also an elected township fiscal officer, who serves a four-year term beginning on April 1 of the year after the election, which is held in November of the year before the presidential election. Vacancies in the fiscal officership or on the board of trustees are filled by the remaining trustees.

References

External links
County website

Townships in Monroe County, Ohio
Townships in Ohio